Sadr was primarily used in the Iranian world to designate an exceptional person, such as a scholar. It was initially used as a personal title for major religious scholars in Transoxiana, then also for high-ranking administrative figures, and from  until the late 18th-century, for the head of the religious authority of a nation. It was then ultimately used for high-ranking figures in Qajar Iran, including the grand vizier.

References

Sources 

 

Government of the Samanid Empire
Government of the Ghaznavid Empire
Government of the Khwarazmian Empire
Government of the Ilkhanate
Government of the Timurid Empire
Government of the Aq Qoyunlu
Government of Safavid Iran
Government of the Zand dynasty
Government of Qajar Iran
Titles in Iran